Doug Martsch (born September 16, 1969) is an American singer and musician. He is best known for his distinctive vocals and guitar playing style in the band Built to Spill.

Career
Martsch's first band was Farm Days, with Andy Capps and Brett Nelson in the early 1980s. His second band was Treepeople, with whom he released three albums and two EPs. He has been the lead singer and guitarist of Built to Spill since 1992. With Built to Spill, he developed a reputation as a preeminent indie rock guitarist; his guitar playing style blends rock, pop, blues, and folk. His influences include J Mascis, Jimi Hendrix, Led Zeppelin, Caustic Resin, Mississippi Fred McDowell, David Bowie, and Neil Young.

In 1994, Martsch formed The Halo Benders with Calvin Johnson of Beat Happening and released three albums.

In 2002, Martsch released his first solo album, Now You Know, to critical acclaim. In 2011, he contributed to a tribute album to The Smiths entitled Please, please, please... with a cover of "Reel Around The Fountain".

Personal life
Martsch is a vegetarian.  He was previously married to Built to Spill co-lyricist Karena Youtz, the sister of former Built to Spill member Ralf Youtz. They have a son.

References

External links
 Ear Candy EXCLUSIVE: Interview with Doug Martsch at SeattlePI.com, November 10, 2006
 Martsch interview at CityPages.com, September 6, 2006
 Extensive interview with Martsch on public radio program/podcast The Sound of Young America, June 17, 2006
 "Martsch Is GOD": An Interview With Doug Martsch at PopMatters.com, October 15, 2002
 Short review of album Doug played and sang on with Boise Cover Band

Living people
American rock guitarists
American male guitarists
American male singers
K Records artists
Up Records
Musicians from Boise, Idaho
1969 births
Built to Spill members
People from Twin Falls, Idaho
Guitarists from Idaho
20th-century American guitarists
20th-century American male musicians